Nandgaon State, also known as Raj Nandgaon, was one of the princely states of India during the period of the British Raj. It was in the present-day Rajnandgaon District of Chhattisgarh.

History

Nandgaon state's last ruler signed the accession to the Indian Union On 1 January 1948.

See also 
 Eastern States Agency
 Chhattisgarh Division
Political integration of India

References

Princely states of India
History of Chhattisgarh
Rajnandgaon district